Red Beard was the first British tactical nuclear weapon.  It was carried by Royal Air Force (RAF)  English Electric Canberra medium bombers and the V bomber force and by Supermarine Scimitars, de Havilland Sea Vixens, and  Blackburn Buccaneers of the Royal Navy's (RN) Fleet Air Arm (FAA).  Developed to Operational Requirement OR.1127, it was introduced in 1961, entered service in 1962. It was replaced by the WE.177 in the early 1970s and was withdrawn from service in 1971.

Design

Red Beard was an unboosted fission weapon that used a composite core (mixed core in British terminology of the time). The composite core used both weapons-grade plutonium and weapons-grade uranium-235, and was intended to minimise the risk of pre-detonation that was a feature of all-plutonium designs of that period with yields larger than 10 kilotons (kt). An added benefit of the composite core was a more economical use of fissile material. Although the design concept of Red Beard was similar to that of the Blue Danube warhead, an innovative means of implosion meant that its overall size could be significantly reduced.

Two versions were produced: the Mk.1, with a yield of 15 kilotons, and the Mk.2, with a yield of 25 kilotons. The Mk.2 was available in two variants, the No.1 used by high-altitude bombers, and the No.2 variant that was intended for low-level delivery by the toss bombing method, and its 'over-the-shoulder' variant referred to as the Low Altitude Bombing System (LABS).

Red Beard's Royal Air Force and Royal Navy service designations were:
 Bomb, Aircraft, HE 2,000 lb MC Mk.1 No.1
 Bomb, Aircraft, HE 2,000 lb MC Mk.1 No.2
 Bomb, Aircraft, HE 2,000 lb MC Mk.2 No.1
 Bomb, Aircraft, HE 2,000 lb MC Mk.2 No.2

Another significant improvement over Blue Danube was the electrical system for the bomb firing mechanism and the radar altimeter fuse. Blue Danube had used 6 volt lead–acid batteries that were unreliable, and had to be installed at the last minute before takeoff. There were also potential risks associated with 'stray' electrical discharges to the firing mechanisms which might have led to accidental detonation. Red Beard used twin ram-air turbines located in the nose, from which there could be no stray discharges before bomb release.  The air inlet can be seen in the extreme nose.  They exhausted through 'blow-out' patches in the nose sides.  Until bomb release, the weapon drew electrical power from the aircraft for heating and pre-heating of the radar fuzes.

To compensate for this stubbiness, and quickly stabilise the bomb after release, Red Beard was equipped with flip-out tail fins that were activated pneumatically, triggered by a lanyard attached to the aircraft.

As with Blue Danube, the fuzing arrangements were composed of twin radar fuzes that were activated by a barometric 'gate' after release.  The barometric gate ensured that the radar fuzes only transmitted in the last few seconds of free-fall, to a computed burst height, and this technique minimised the possibility of radar countermeasures disabling the radar fuzes.  There were back-up contact and graze fuzes to ensure bomb destruction in the event of a misfire.

None of the variants allowed in-flight arming of the fissile core.  The core was inserted before take-off, in a process referred to as 'last minute loading'.  For carrier-borne aircraft, landing with the armed weapon was forbidden, and the aircraft would instead be diverted to a shore airbase.  Although the Royal Navy required its Sea Vixen aircraft to be type-approved for Red Beard carriage as insurance against delays in the development of the Blackburn Buccaneer, the Sea Vixen never deployed in the nuclear strike role.  Early models were subject to severe environmental limitations, especially when loaded into Royal Navy Scimitars on exposed aircraft carrier decks in Northern waters.  The Mk.2 variants were better engineered to withstand extreme conditions, and other than the yield difference, this was the main area of difference.

When the bomb was delivered by low-level toss bombing, the aircraft was almost always at a lower altitude than the burst height; so in effect, the bomb was not really 'dropped', but was released and 'flew' upwards in a ballistic trajectory, to detonate when it reached the required altitude.

Service in United Kingdom and Singapore
Royal Air Force stocks of Red Beard for the Canberra and V-bomber forces totalled 110.  Of these, forty-eight were deployed in Cyprus to meet the UK's commitments to Central Treaty Organization (CENTO), forty-eight were deployed in Singapore at RAF Tengah to meet commitments to Southeast Asia Treaty Organization (SEATO), and the remainder were located in the United Kingdom.  Royal Navy stocks are believed, from archived declassified documents, to total thirty-five weapons, to be shared between five aircraft carriers, and shore-based supply and overhaul infrastructure.  The carriers were thought (from similar sources) to each have an air-conditioned storage capacity for five Red Beard weapons.

Before the Red Beard codename was issued in 1952, it was frequently referred to in official documents as the 'Javelin Bomb', because it was originally conceived as a weapon for the 'thin-wing Javelin bomber', a projected derivative of the (thick wing) Gloster Javelin all-weather fighter.  The designation 'target marker bomb' was a euphemism used to disguise the nature of the bomb, so that its dimensions and weights etc. could be circulated to aircraft and aircraft equipment designers, without compromising security.

It was replaced by the WE.177 in the early 1970s.

John Dolphin
Whilst Chief Engineer at the Atomic Weapons Research Establishment (AWRE), Aldermaston, John Dolphin worked on the Red Beard trigger mechanism.  Subsequently, in July 1959, Dolphin requested an ex-gratia financial award for his work on the weapon; but was turned down.  His claim was that although it was not his job to do so, he invented the 'Rotary Hot Line' device that eventually became the trigger for the Red Beard bomb (and which was used in all subsequent thermonuclear bombs).  He further stated that his invention brought to an end the deadlock in meeting the specification for the Red Beard, and that he had to overcome "serious opposition" against the senior scientists whose job did include the brief for its invention.  His claim was refused on the grounds that as a 'Chief Engineer', it was within the scope of his duties.

See also
 Rainbow Codes

References

Bibliography
 Leitch, Andy. "V-Force Arsenal: Weapons for the Valiant, Victor and Vulcan". Air Enthusiast No. 107, September/October 2003. pp. 52–59.

External links
Red Beard — at skomer.u-net.com
Video of Red Beard detonation during 1956 proof tests at Maralinga — at SonicBomb.com
Photos of British nuclear tests - includes Red Beard — at NuclearWeaponArchive.org

Tactical nuclear weapons
Cold War weapons of the United Kingdom
Nuclear bombs of the United Kingdom
1962 establishments in the United Kingdom
1971 disestablishments
Military equipment introduced in the 1960s